Simpang Empat or Simpang Ampat is a small town located in Hutan Melintang, Bagan Datuk District, Perak, Malaysia.

References

Bagan Datuk District
Towns in Perak